Sot is a village located in Syrmia, Vojvodina, Serbia. It is situated in the Šid municipality, in the Syrmia District. The village is ethnically mixed and its population numbering 791 people (2002 census).

Ethnic groups (2002 census)

The population of the village include:
 340 (42.98%) Serbs
 317 (40.08%) Croats
 33 (4.17%) Hungarians
 28 (3.54%) Slovaks
 15 (1.90%) Yugoslavs
 others.

Historical population

1961: 1,272
1971: 1,077
1981: 900
1991: 819
2002: 791

References
Slobodan Ćurčić, Broj stanovnika Vojvodine, Novi Sad, 1996.

See also
List of places in Serbia
List of cities, towns and villages in Vojvodina

Populated places in Syrmia